The Falcon of Sparta is an historical fiction novel by British author Conn Iggulden. It is loosely based on the Anabasis written in 370 BC by Xenophon.

Part I describes the events leading up to and including the Battle of Cunaxa in 401 BC, in which Prince Cyrus the Younger challenges his elder brother Artaxerxes II to the throne of the Achaemenid Empire. Part II describes the aftermath of the battle, in which the 'Ten Thousand' (a group of Greek mercenaries and camp followers) attempt to escape Persia back to the safety of Greece.

The hardback first edition book was published by Michael Joseph in May 2018 with the paperback published by Penguin Books in May 2019. The audiobook is read by Michael Fox.

Key characters
 Artaxerxes II - Persian Prince and eldest son of Darius II. He ascends to the throne of Persia upon his father's death
 Cyrus the Younger - Persian Prince and younger brother of Artaxerxes. He seeks to overthrow his brother
 Clearchus of Sparta - General of Spartan mercenaries employed by Cyrus
 Xenophon - Greek historian and soldier who leads the ten thousand Greeks following Cunaxa
 Tissaphernes - Persian Satrap of Artaxerxes II who uncovers Cryrus' plans for rebellion
 Menon - A Thessalian mercenary general employed by Cyrus
 Cheirisophus - Spartan who supports Xenophon in guiding the Ten Thousand to safety
 Ariaeus - A Persian general who sides with Cyrus at the Battle of Cunaxa
 Socrates - A Greek philosopher, and former teacher of Xenophon

References

2018 British novels
Novels by Conn Iggulden
Anabasis (Xenophon)
Michael Joseph books